Kristian Huber (born 13 June 1997) is an Austrian bobsledder.

Career
He won a silver medal at the IBSF World Championships 2021 in the four-man event.

References

External links

1997 births
Living people
Austrian male bobsledders
Bobsledders at the 2022 Winter Olympics
Olympic bobsledders of Austria